{{DISPLAYTITLE:C20H18O8}}
The molecular formula C20H18O8 (molar mass: 386.35 g/mol, exact mass: 386.100159 u) may refer to:
 Diferulic acids (for instance 8,5'-diferulic acid)
 Arboreol, an epoxylignan
 Gummadiol, a lignan hemiacetal

References